International Association for Semiotic Studies (Association Internationale de Sémiotique, IASS-AIS) is the major world organisation of semioticians, established in 1969.

Members of the association include Algirdas Julien Greimas, Roman Jakobson, Julia Kristeva, Emile Benveniste, André Martinet, Roland Barthes, Umberto Eco, Thomas A. Sebeok, and Juri Lotman.

The official journal of the association is Semiotica, published by De Gruyter Mouton.  The working languages of the association are English and French.

The Executive Committee of the IASS (le Comité Directeur de l’AIS) consists of the representatives from semiotic societies of member countries (two from each).

World congresses in semiotics
The association is regularly organising the world congresses in semiotics.
 Milan, Italy, June 2–6, 1974 (A Semiotic Landscape)
 Vienna, Austria, July 2–6, 1979 (Semiotics Unfolding)
 Palermo, Italy, June 24–29, 1984 (Semiotic Theory and Practice)
 Barcelona, Spain, and Perpignan, France, March 31 – April 4, 1989 (Signs of Humanity/L’homme et ses signes)
 Berkeley, USA, June 12–18, 1994 (Signs of the World. Synthesis in Diversity)
 Guadalajara, Mexico, July 13–18, 1997 (Semiotics Bridging Nature and Culture/La sémiotique: carrefour de la nature et de la culture/La semiotica. Intersección de la naturaleza y de la cultura)
 Dresden, Germany, October 6–11, 1999 (Sign Processes in Complex Systems/Zeichenprozesse in komplexen Systemen)
 Lyon, France, July 7–12, 2004 (Signes du monde. Interculturalité et globalisation / Signs of the World. Interculturality and Globalization / Zeichen der Welt: Interkulturalität und Globalisierung / Los signos del mundo: Interculturalidad y Globalización)
 Helsinki and Imatra, Finland, June 11–17, 2007 (Understanding/Misunderstanding)
 A Coruña, Spain, September 22–26, 2009 (Culture of Communication/Communication of Culture) See
 Nanjing, China, October 5–9, 2012 (Global Semiotics: Bridging Different Civilizations) See 
 Sofia, Bulgaria, September 16–20, 2014 (New Semiotics: Between Tradition and Innovation) See
 Kaunas, Lithuania, June 26–30, 2017 (Cross-Inter-Multi-Trans) vt 
 Buenos Aires, Argentina, September 9–13, 2019 (Trajectories) vt
 Thessaloniki, Greece, August 30 – September 3 (Semiotics in the Lifeworld) vt

Presidents
The list of the presidents of the association include
 Emile Benveniste (1969–1972)
 Cesare Segre (1972–?)
 Jerzy Pelc (1984–1994)
 Roland Posner (1994–2004)
 Eero Tarasti (2004–2014)
 Paul Cobley (since 2014)

External links
 IASS-AIS

See also
International Society for Biosemiotic Studies
Semiotic Society of America
International Association for Visual Semiotics

Semiotics organizations
Organizations established in 1969